Asaphobelis is a monotypic genus of Brazilian jumping spiders containing the single species, Asaphobelis physonychus. It was first described by Eugène Louis Simon in 1902, and is only found in Brazil.

References

Monotypic Salticidae genera
Salticidae
Spiders of South America
Spiders of the Caribbean